Tha Ruea is a district (amphoe) in northeastern part of Phra Nakhon Si Ayutthaya province, central Thailand.

History
The original name of the district was Nakhon Noi. In 1917, it was renamed Tha Ruea to commemorate an important event within the district. When the hunter Bun found the Buddha's footprint in Sara Buri province, King Songtham travelled by royal barge along the Pa Sak River to worship. He moored his royal barge in the district, and continued his travel overland. His route has since become a royal tradition, as later kings always travelled by this way to worship Buddha's footprint in Wat Phra Phutthabat. The Thai word "tha ruea" means "port" or "pier".

Geography
Neighbouring districts are (from the north clockwise) Don Phut, Ban Mo, Sao Hai, Nong Saeng of Saraburi province, and Phachi and Nakhon Luang of Ayutthaya Province.

Administration

Provincial government
The district is divided into 10 subdistricts (tambons), which are further subdivided into 84 villages (mubans).

Local government
As of 31 December 2018 there are two subdistrict municipalities (thesaban tambon) in the district. The non-municipal areas are administered by nine Subdistrict Administrative Organizations - SAO (ongkan borihan suan tambon).

References

Tha Ruea